The Merced River, in the central part of the U.S. state of California, is a -long tributary of the San Joaquin River flowing from the Sierra Nevada into the San Joaquin Valley. It is most well known for its swift and steep course through the southern part of Yosemite National Park, where it is the primary watercourse flowing through Yosemite Valley. The river's character changes dramatically once it reaches the plains of the agricultural San Joaquin Valley, where it becomes a slow-moving meandering stream.

The river first formed as the Sierra Nevada rose about 10 million years ago, and sediment eroded from its canyon helped form the flat floor of the San Joaquin Valley. Glaciation during the ice ages carved the high elevation parts of the watershed, including Yosemite Valley, into their present shape. Historically, there was an extensive riparian zone which provided habitat for millions of migrating birds, and the river had one of the southernmost runs of chinook salmon in North America.

Miwok and Paiute people lived along the river for thousands of years before Spanish and Mexican military expeditions passed through in the early 19th century. The California Gold Rush brought many people into California and some settled in towns along the lower Merced River. A railroad was built along the Merced canyon, enabling mining and logging in the upper watershed, and later carrying tourists to Yosemite National Park. Conflicts between settlers and Native Americans resulted in wars, including the expulsion of the Ahwahnechee from Yosemite.

Large-scale irrigation was introduced to the San Joaquin Valley in the late 19th century, and led to the construction of numerous state, federal and privately owned dams, which blocked migrating salmon and caused a large decline in riparian habitat. Diversion of water for irrigation often reduces the river to a small stream by the time it reaches its mouth. Efforts to mitigate environmental damage include habitat conservation work, re-establishment of historic streamflow patterns, and the construction of a salmon hatchery.

Course
From its headwaters, the river flows north for a short distance and collects the Lyell Peak Fork.

The Merced continues to the northwest for  where collects into Merced Lake.  Leaving Merced Lake, the river continues to the west northwest for  where the canyons open up into Echo Valley.  The river then turns generally westward for another , where it snakes through a spectacular narrow gorge between massive, glacially resistant granite cliffs. The gorge opens up after Bunnell Point and Sugarloaf Dome confine the river to form Bunnell Cascade, before turning southward through the Lost Valley of the Merced, and then spills over a granite cliff into Little Yosemite Valley, named for its resemblance to Yosemite Valley downstream.

The Merced River drops over Nevada Fall and Vernal Fall, together known as the "Giant Staircase", then receives Illilouette Creek and flows into Yosemite Valley, where it meanders between pine forests and meadows that fill the valley floor. Tenaya, Yosemite, Bridalveil and Pigeon Creeks join the Merced River in Yosemite Valley. Beyond the glacial moraine at the western end of the valley the river flows through the steep Merced River Canyon, picks up Cascade Creek and turns south near El Portal. State Route 140 follows the river out of the west entrance to the national park, a few miles before the South Fork Merced River, the largest tributary, joins from the left.

The river arcs northwest to receive the North Fork, and a few miles after it enters Lake McClure, formed by New Exchequer Dam. Below New Exchequer, the river flows west through a heavily irrigated region of the Central Valley, passing through McSwain and Crocker-Huffman Dams and the cities of Hopeton, Delhi and Livingston. It joins the San Joaquin River at Hills Ferry, a few miles south of Turlock.

Watershed
The Merced River watershed encompasses  in the central Sierra Nevada. To the north it is bordered by the watershed of the Tuolumne River, the other major river draining Yosemite National Park. On the south, the Merced watershed borders on the headwaters of the San Joaquin River. To the east, it is bordered by the Sierra crest which divides it from the endorheic Great Basin watershed of Mono Lake.

Much of the Merced River basin is at high elevation, where an alpine climate prevails. The Sierra receives heavy snowfall in the winter, which melts in the spring and early summer causing annual flooding. By late autumn the river level has dropped considerably, and some smaller tributaries dry up altogether. Up to 85% of the flow above Happy Isles comes from melting snow. In the dry season, groundwater provides the only base flow to the river. In addition, the river is fed by dozens of high Sierra lakes, the largest of which include Merced Lake, Tenaya Lake, Ostrander Lake, the Chain Lakes, and May Lake. The foothills experience a drier Mediterranean climate, while the San Joaquin Valley floor is dry enough to be considered semi-desert.

The Merced River is the third largest tributary of the San Joaquin River. The United States Geological Survey has river gauges at three locations along the Merced River: at Happy Isles, above Lake McClure, and at the mouth. The first two record flows unaffected by dams and human intervention, but discharge at the mouth is chiefly controlled by New Exchequer Dam. The Lake McClure gauge, located at the former mining town of Bagby, is probably the most accurate gauge for flows overall. For the mouth gauge, the highest flow was only  in 1950.

Ecology

According to a study in 2006, there were 37 fish species, 127 bird species, and 140 insect and invertebrate species found in the Merced River watershed. Due to differences in climate, there is a large disparity between species found in the upper watershed (above Lake McClure) and along the lower river.

There are 26 species of native and introduced fish in the lower Central Valley portion of the river, including Sacramento sucker, smallmouth bass, largemouth bass and carp. Anadromous fish species found in the lower river are chinook salmon, Pacific lamprey and striped bass. The upper section of the river, defined as the stretch from Lake McClure to the headwaters, has 11 species of fish. Historically, the range of anadromous fish extended to the waterfalls at the head of Yosemite Valley, but dams have blocked their migration since the early 1900s, and diversions frequently dewater their remaining spawning habitat in the lower part of the river. Environmental measures enacted in the late 20th century have had some success in boosting chinook salmon populations, from a record low of 500 fish during several years in the 1950s, to a high of 30,000 in 1984. Since the 1970s, the annual chinook run has averaged about 5,300.

Of the 127 bird species found along the Merced River, only 35 occur along the entire length of the river. Many of these birds are migratory and only pass the area a few times every year, while 109 species of birds are found only in the breeding season. Birds are more abundant along the slow-moving lower river, which has more suitable riparian habitat compared to the rocky, swift upper river. Common species of bird throughout the basin include ruby-crowned kinglet, cedar waxwing, American robin, yellow-rumped warbler, tree swallow and European starling, and several endangered species, including white-tailed kite and Swainson's hawk. Birds that occur commonly in the middle and upper sections of the Merced River include mourning dove, Cassin's finch, California quail, dark-eyed junco, woodpecker, dipper, great blue heron, scrub jay, red-winged blackbird, red-tailed hawk, turkey vulture, cliff swallow, canyon wren, merganser, and bald eagles. Common insects found along the river include mayflies, stoneflies and caddisflies. The river is impacted by invasive Asiatic clam, Chinese mitten crab, and New Zealand mud snail.

Many species of plants are found throughout the middle and upper basin, including California poppy, white alder, Oregon ash, oak, poison oak, bigleaf maple, Indian rhubarb, buttonbush, willow, whiteleaf manzanita, and historically, sugar pine, before heavy logging in the late 19th century. Squirrels, raccoon, jackrabbits, bats, skunks, beavers, mule deer, coyote, bobcat and black bear are among the mammal species found in the middle and upper watershed.

One species of interest is the limestone salamander, an extremely rare amphibian whose only habitat is the Merced Canyon downstream of Yosemite Valley. The salamander depends on the limestone walls of the Merced Canyon to survive. To protect the salamander, a  segment of the canyon covering  was designated an "Area of Critical Environmental Concern" in 1986.

Geology

When the North American Plate on its slow journey westwards encountered the Pacific Plate approximately 250 million years ago during the Paleozoic, the latter began to subduct under the North American continent. Intense pressure underground caused some of the Pacific Plate to melt, and the resulting upwelling magma pushed up and hardened into the granite batholith that makes up much of the Sierra Nevada. Extensive layers of marine sedimentary rock that originally made up the ancient Pacific seabed were also pushed up by the rising granite, and the ancestral Merced River formed on this layer of rock. Over millions of years, the Merced cut a deep canyon through the softer sedimentary rock, eventually hitting the hard granite beneath. The encounter with this resilient rock layer caused the Merced River to mostly stop its downcutting, although tributary streams continued to widen the ancient canyon.

Over about 80 million years, erosion caused the transportation of massive amounts of alluvial sediment to the floor of the Central Valley, where it was trapped between the California Coast Range on the west and the Sierra Nevada on the east, forming an incredibly flat and fertile land surface. The present-day form of the upper Merced River watershed, however, was formed by glaciers, and the lower watershed was indirectly but significantly affected.

When the last glacial period or Ice Age arrived, a series of four tremendous valley glaciers filled the upper basin of the Merced River. These glaciers rose in branches upstream of Yosemite Valley, descending from the Merced River headwaters, Tenaya Canyon and Illilouette Creek. Tenaya Canyon was actually eroded even deeper by an arm of the Tuolumne Glacier, which formed the Grand Canyon of the Tuolumne and Hetch Hetchy Valley on the Tuolumne River in the north. Little Yosemite Valley formed as a result of the underlying rock being harder than that below the Giant Staircase, the cliff wall containing Vernal Fall and Nevada Fall. These glaciers formed the granite cliffs that now constitute landmarks such as Half Dome, El Capitán, and Cloud's Rest.

The first and largest glacier was the Sherwin or Pre-Tahoe glacier, which eroded the upper Merced watershed to an extent close to its present form. Three stages followed during the Wisconsinian glaciation; these were the Tahoe, Tenaya and Tioga stages, of which the Tioga was the smallest. The Tioga glacier left at the mouth of Yosemite Valley a rocky moraine. This moraine was actually one of several moraines deposited by the four glaciations, which include Medial Moraine and Bridalveil Moraine. After the Tioga Glacier retreated this moraine formed a lake that flooded nearly the entire valley. Gradual sedimentation filled Lake Yosemite, creating a broad and flat valley floor. Sediments of glacial origin continued to travel down the Merced River following then, helping to form the flat floor of the Central Valley.

History

Of the many Native American tribes that have lived on the Merced River the most prominent were the Miwok (consisting of Plains Miwok and Sierra Miwok), Paiute, and Ahwahnechee. Many Plains Miwok settled in the lowlands along the lower Merced River. The Sierra (or Mountain) Miwok lived in the upper Merced Canyon and in Yosemite Valley, and at the time the first white explorers came to the area, there were about 450 Sierra Miwok split among ten permanent villages. Paiute, of origin from the eastern Sierra near the Mono Lake area, also lived in the upper watershed of the Merced River. The Sierra Miwok and Mono Lake Paiute eventually, through cultural interaction over time, formed a new culture, the Ahwahnechee, derived from Ahwahnee, meaning "the valley shaped like a big mouth" (referring to U-shaped Yosemite Valley).

In the early 19th century, several military expeditions sent by Spanish colonists from coastal California traveled into the Central Valley. One of these trips, headed by lieutenant Gabriel Moraga, arrived on the south bank of the Merced River on September 29, 1806. They named the river Rio de Nuestra Señora de la Merced (River of Our Lady of Mercy), who is the patron saint of the diocese of Barcelona and is celebrated on September 24. Another expedition to the Central Valley in 1805 also named the Kings River upon reaching it on January 6, 1805, which is the feast of the Magi or Epiphany. Moraga's expedition was part of a series of exploratory ventures, funded by the Spanish government, to find suitable sites for missions in the Central Valley and the Sierra Nevada foothills. In 1808 and 1810, Moraga led further expeditions along the lower Merced River below Merced Canyon, each time coming to nothing. Eventually, plans to establish a mission chain in the Valley were abandoned. In 1855, Merced County was created, named after the Merced River.

Following the establishment of Merced County and the independence of California from Mexico, many settlers came to the Merced River area and established small towns on the Merced River. One of the first was Dover, established in 1844 at the confluence of the Merced River with the San Joaquin River. Dover functioned as an "inland seaport" where boats delivered supplies from the San Francisco Bay area to settlers in the San Joaquin Valley. Some towns that followed were Hopeton, Snelling and Merced Falls, the latter named for a set of rapids on the Merced River near the present-day site of McSwain Dam. In the late 1880s a flour mill, woolen mill and a few lumber mills were constructed at Merced Falls. The Sugar Pine Lumber Company and Yosemite Lumber Company operated lumber mills at Merced Falls for over thirty years, relying on narrow-gauge railroads to ship lumber from the Sierra Nevada along the Merced River. Following the construction of the Central Pacific and Southern Pacific Railroads, many of the river towns on the Merced River were deserted. Several cities that did achieve prominence, however, include Merced and Turlock, both located on the railroad.

The California Gold Rush in the 1850s saw gradually increasing mining in Merced Canyon and Yosemite Valley. Many Native Americans in the area revolted, leading to conflicts between miners and the Ahwahnechee. In 1851 the Mariposa Battalion was formed to drive the remaining Ahwahnechee out of the valley into reservations. The Battalion fought an Ahwahnechee group led by Chief Tenaya over the South Fork of the Merced River. Eventually, they succeeded in driving most of the Indians out of the Yosemite Valley, first into a reservation near Fresno. Following the gold rush, the Ahwahnechee were allowed back into Yosemite Valley, but further incidents prompted a second battalion to drive them out, this time to the Mono Lake area. Many place names in the valley have their origin from the Mariposa Battalion.

Even before the establishment of Yosemite National Park, tourists began to travel into the Merced Canyon and Yosemite Valley as early as 1855. The first roads were constructed into Yosemite Valley in the 1870s. The first was Coulterville Road, followed by Big Oak Flat Road, a trading route from Stockton to Merced Canyon. Environmental movements led by John Muir and Robert Underwood Johnson convinced the U.S. Congress to establish Yosemite National Park in 1890. With the creation of the national park tourism to the Valley and the Merced River increased significantly, leading to many other roads being built throughout the upper Merced River watershed. Other national forests protecting more of the Merced River upper basin followed, including Sierra National Forest and Stanislaus National Forest.

The Yosemite Valley Railroad, originally established with the discovery of mineral deposits in Yosemite Valley and Merced Canyon, continued functioning through the early 20th century carrying tourists to Yosemite Valley along the Merced River. El Portal Road, constructed through Merced Canyon in 1926, put an end to passenger service on the railway, but operations continued until the mid-1940s, when major flooding occurred, destroying sections of the railroad.
In the early 20th century, when the upper Merced River basin lay mostly protected, the lower river was the subject of dam-building and irrigation diversions by the Merced Irrigation District. The District proposed the Exchequer Dam, completed in the mid-1920s and raised in the 1960s, as a water storage facility on the Merced River.

By the late 1950s and early 1960s, irrigation in the San Joaquin Valley was to such an extent that many of the rivers ran dry in sections. Upriver of the Merced River confluence with the San Joaquin, the latter river was usually dry, only regaining flow where the Merced River enters. In the mid-20th century, the flow in the Merced River diminished to such a degree that very few salmon returned to spawn in the lower section of the Merced River. In 1991, a fish hatchery, the Merced River Hatchery, was built beside the Merced River just downstream of the Crocker-Huffman Diversion Dam, the lowermost Merced River dam. Fall chinook salmon travel up a fish ladder into the hatchery's pools, which are supplied with water diverted from the Merced River.

Yosemite Valley saw significant amounts of damage when the river flooded the valley in 1997.

River modifications

Despite its partial status as a National Wild and Scenic River, the Merced River has many dams and irrigation diversions. New Exchequer Dam is the largest dam on the river and forms Lake McClure, which holds  of water for irrigation, flood control and hydropower generation. This modern structure was preceded by the old Exchequer Dam forming  Exchequer Reservoir. The old concrete arch dam, completed in 1926, was flooded out when the new concrete-faced rockfill dam was built in 1967, but occasionally reappears during periods of low water.

Downstream of New Exchequer Dam is McSwain Dam, which serves as a regulating forebay for New Exchequer Dam and also generates power. Below this dam is Merced Falls Dam, an irrigation diversion dam. The lowermost, the Crocker-Huffman Diversion Dam, was built in 1906 and completely blocks the passage of anadromous fish up the Merced River.
Together, these diversions remove almost half the natural flow of the Merced River, and an even greater proportion during dry years.

Cascades Diversion Dam was a timber crib dam built in 1917 near where the Merced River flows out of Yosemite Valley. Originally built to generate hydropower, the dam was decommissioned in 1985 but remained standing for a number of years afterward. After the great flood of 1997, the U.S. Bureau of Reclamation surveyed the dam and found it in danger of failure. Classified as a "high hazard" structure, it was originally considered for inclusion on the National Register of Historic Places but was deemed too dangerous, and was subsequently removed. Today, the Merced River above Lake McClure is completely free-flowing and unobstructed by any dams.

Irrigation has taken most of the water out of the lower river, which is often reduced to a small stream where it joins the San Joaquin. Irrigation return flows carry pesticides, fertilizer and other pollutants into the river. The MID is federally required to allow at least  of water annually to flow continually down the river, not including floodwater releases.

Recreation

The Merced River and its tributaries are a popular recreational area in part because of Yosemite National Park. There are many activities within the watershed, including boating, fishing, camping and hiking. Whitewater rafting is permitted throughout Merced River Canyon from the downstream half of Yosemite Valley to the entrance of Lake McClure. The most difficult rapids in this segment rate Class III and Class IV, mostly upstream of El Portal. There is also boating on Lake McClure. Camping throughout the upper Merced watershed is generally only permitted in designated campgrounds. Campgrounds along the Merced River and its tributaries include ones at Railroad Flat, McCabe Flat, Willow Placer, Merced Lake, Vogelsang Lake, Sunrise Creek, May Lake, Bridalveil Creek, and a ski hut at Ostrander Lake, the source of Bridalveil Creek.

The name "Railroad Flat" originates from the Yosemite Valley Railroad, which once travelled up Merced River Canyon into Yosemite Valley. The old railroad grade still exists, and is now the site of a public trail. Many other trails lead throughout the Merced River watershed, notably the John Muir Trail, which starts near Happy Isles and climbs the Giant Staircase, past Vernal and Nevada Falls, into Little Yosemite Valley and north along Sunrise Creek to join the Pacific Crest Trail near Tuolumne Meadows. Trails also follow the river through Little Yosemite Valley to the headwaters area, and along Illilouette, Bridalveil, Yosemite, Alder and Chilnualna Creeks, and the lower South Fork of the Merced River. There are no trails along some segments, including the lower Bridalveil Creek, upper South Fork, and specifically Tenaya Canyon, which is extremely dangerous.

See also
List of rivers of California

References

External links

Merced River Watershed Portal
Merced Irrigation District
Merced Irrigation District Watershed Map
San Joaquin Salmon in creek running north
Fanciful History of Ballico, California
360 Merced River Video Call Room
Merced Wild and Scenic River - BLM page

 
Rivers of the Sierra Nevada (United States)
Rivers of Yosemite National Park
Rivers of Mariposa County, California
Rivers of Merced County, California
Geography of the San Joaquin Valley
Tributaries of the San Joaquin River
Wild and Scenic Rivers of the United States
Rivers of Northern California
Rivers of the Sierra Nevada in California
Rivers with fish ladders